Bontonfilm is a Czech film company. It was founded in 1994 by transformation from Lucernafilm Video (successor of Ústřední půjčovna filmů).

As of 2020, Bontonfilm holds a 15% market share being 2nd largest Czech distributor (behind Falcon a.s., Cinemart, Vertical Entertainment a.s. and Bioscop a.s.).

History
Bontonfilm is linked with Bonton company that as founded in 1990 to produce music. Bonton eventually expanded to film industry and acquired Lucernafilm Video which became Bontonfilm. Bontonfilm quickly became biggest Czech film distributor with about 30% share of the market.

Bontonfilm managed to partner with major American studios including  20th Century Fox, DreamWorks Animation, Universal Pictures and Paramount. Bontonfilm distributed films by these studios in the Czech Republic. The main rival of Bontonfilm was Falcon a.s. which distributes films by Walt Disney Pictures and Columbia Pictures.

This changed in 2013, major American studios switched to Cinemart and Bontonfilm lost its position of strongest film distribution company of Czech market, falling to fourth place in the market.

Films

Czech

References

External links

Entertainment companies established in 1994
Mass media companies established in 1994
Czech film companies
Entertainment companies of the Czech Republic